The following people have served as deans of the Brigham Young University J. Reuben Clark Law School.

Brigham Young University
Brigham Young University faculty